Nadia Sofia Parkes (born 31 December 1995) is an English actress. She is known for her roles in the Starz series The Spanish Princess (2019–2020), the Sky Atlantic series Domina (2021), and the Netflix series The Bastard Son & The Devil Himself (2022).

Early life
Parkes grew up in Leamington Spa. She attended The King's High School for Girls. She went on to train at the London Academy of Music and Dramatic Art (LAMDA), graduating in 2018.

Career
Parkes began her career when she was cast as Rosa, one of Catherine of Aragon’s trusted ladies-in-waiting, in the Starz limited series The Spanish Princess. In 2019, she was cast as young Livia in the Sky Atlantic limited series Domina.

She has also had guest roles in the BBC shows Doctor Who and Starstruck.

Personal life
Both her parents are opticians. She was previously in a relationship with fellow actor Tom Holland.

Filmography

References

External links

Living people
1995 births
Actresses from Warwickshire
Alumni of the London Academy of Music and Dramatic Art
People educated at The King's High School for Girls
People from Leamington Spa